Alfred "Mickey" Sharp (14 November 1914 – 15 March 2003) was an Australian rules footballer who played with Fitzroy in the Victorian Football League (VFL).

Sharp was the son of 1904 Fitzroy premiership player Alf Sharp.

A rover, he played 104 games for Fitzroy, from 1932 to 1941.

He twice represented Victoria at interstate football, both times in 1938.

References

External links
 
 

1914 births
Australian rules footballers from Victoria (Australia)
Fitzroy Football Club players
2003 deaths